This is a list of season 2 episodes of the Extreme Makeover: Home Edition series.

Episodes

See also
 List of Extreme Makeover: Home Edition episodes
 Extreme Makeover: Home Edition Specials

Notes

References 

2004 American television seasons
2005 American television seasons